Rhené Jaque, the pen name of Marguerite Marie Alice Cartier (February 4, 1918 – July 31, 2006), was a Canadian musician, composer and music educator living in Quebec.

Born in Beauharnois, she joined the Sisters of the Holy Names of Jesus and Mary and, in 1938, took the name Sister Jacques-René. She studied at the École supérieure de musique d'Outremont with Claude Champagne, Marvin Duchow, Louis Bailly and Camille Couture. In 1943, she began teaching violin and music theory at the École de musique Vincent-d'Indy. She obtained a BMus degree in 1949 and a Lauréat in music in 1955.

She composed many teaching pieces for pianists and violinists. Rachel Cavalho recorded Jaque's Rustic Dance/Fête champêtre and Deux Inventions à deux voix. Her Toccate was recorded by Elaine Keillor. One of her two Suites for piano was recorded by Antonín Kubálek and by Allen Reiser. She was a member of the Canadian League of Composers and a life member of the Association of Canadian Women Composers.

She died in Montreal at the age of 88.

References 

1918 births
2006 deaths
Canadian classical composers
Canadian music educators
Canadian classical violinists
20th-century Canadian nuns
21st-century Canadian nuns
Women music educators
20th-century classical violinists
Canadian women composers
20th-century Canadian violinists and fiddlers
Canadian women violinists and fiddlers